Alexander Zwo (literally translated "Alexander No. 2") is a German-French-Austrian-Italian TV mini-series directed by Franz Peter Wirth.

Synopsis
Mike Friedberg (Jean-Claude Bouillon) is a chemist in the United States. When his father dies in a car accident in Europe, Friedberg jr. returns home in order to manage the inherited chemical plant in Munich. Soon he learns that this plant does important research for the NATO. Then, all of a sudden, attempts on his life are made. He is shot at and has a strange car accident, very similar to the one that killed his father. He scarcely survives an explosion in the laboratory but his employee Dr. Terbot (Renato Carmine) dies. On a train, a killer called Sonja (Marina Malfatti) attempts to kill him. She turns out being a Soviet-Russian secret agent and confuses him with her former lover, his twin brother Alexander. Mike understands that his twin brother, who disappeared when they were little children, is not dead. He pretends to be the double agent Alexander and seduces Sonja. She lets him get away but now another killer gets a contract on Mike. While Mike tries to prove that he is no agent, his twin brother wants the opposite. Alexander plans to fake his own death by having Mike killed so that he is safe and can enjoy his life with Sonja. The CIA seems to be eager to comply with that plan. Mike turns to the American Embassy but he is believed to be paranoid. Eventually, he asks the German MAD for protection. He is told he should try to fix things by returning to the United States but former friends pretend not to know him. In the end, his evil brother uses Sonja to contact Mike and to lure him into a deadly trap.

Overview of all episodes

Cast

External links
 
Trailer on YouTube

1970s French television series
1970s French television miniseries
1970s German television miniseries
French crime drama television series
German crime television series
Espionage television series
Austrian television series
Italian television series
1972 French television series debuts
1973 French television series endings
1972 German television series debuts
1973 German television series endings
German-language television shows
Das Erste original programming
Films directed by Franz Peter Wirth